The Chinese Type 312 class minesweeper was also known as Futi class. It was the first remote minesweeping drone, and was successfully used in the Vietnam War.

Although originally designed as a minesweeping drone, the Type 312 can also be manned by a 3-man crew as a regular minesweeper. The chief designer was Mr. Diao Haiguang (刁海光) of the 710th Institute, and from the start of the project to the completion of the first two units (two units are being built simultaneously), it only took less than two years when the first two units entered the service for the People's Liberation Army Navy. Due to its small size, this class is maintained on land and thus is in better conditions than most of other larger boats and ships in the reserve fleet.

References

Minesweepers of the People's Liberation Army Navy